Giulio Nasso (November 28, 1906 in San Martino di Taurianova – October 23, 1999 in New York) was an American builder.

Nasso emigrated from Italy to New York at age 18.

Most famous buildings

Madison Square Garden
General Motors Building

External links
 Giulio Nasso

1906 births
1999 deaths
20th-century American businesspeople
Italian emigrants to the United States